Point and shoot may refer to:

 Point-and-shoot camera
 Point-and-shoot interface
 "Point and Shoot", an episode of Better Call Saul

Literature
Point and Shoot may refer to:

 Point and Shoot (film), a 2014 documentary film about Matthew VanDyke
 Point and Shoot, a book of street photography by Henry Bond